Francisco Sánchez Rojas was a Chilean footballer. Sánchez is also one of the founding members of Colo-Colo, and has been credited as co-inventor of the bicycle kick, also known as "La Chilena".

References 

Year of birth missing
Colo-Colo footballers
1951 deaths
Chilean footballers
Association football midfielders